Arisil or Aricil is a branch of the river Kaveri in the Tanjore district. It was the site of many a battle between the different Tamil kingdoms. One of the most notable being the 9th-century war between Nripatunga Pallava and Sri Mara Pandya in which the latter was defeated. Nripatunga was the son of Nandivarman III by a Rashtrakuta princess

The Arisil is also mentioned in the 10th chapter of the famous Tamil book Ponniyin Selvan.

Gallery

References 

Rivers of Tamil Nadu
Tributaries of the Kaveri River
Rivers of India